Rita Lakatos (born 6 July 1999) is a Hungarian handballer for Siófok KC, and the Hungarian national team.

She made her international debut on 1 December 2018 against Netherlands.

Achievements 
National team
IHF Women's Junior World Championship:
: 2018
EHF Youth European Championship:
: 2015
Domestic competitions
Nemzeti Bajnokság I:
: 2016
Magyar Kupa:
: 2016
European competitions
EHF Champions League:
: 2016
Other competitions
ISF World Schools Championship:
: 2016

References

External links

1999 births
Living people
Sportspeople from Dunajská Streda
Győri Audi ETO KC players
Hungarian female handball players
Expatriate handball players
Hungarian expatriate sportspeople in Norway